Angelo P. Graham (1932-2017) was an American art director. He won an Oscar and was nominated for three more in the category Best Art Direction. He worked on nearly 30 films during his 30-year career.

Selected filmography
Graham won an Academy Award for Best Art Direction and was nominated for three more:
Won
 The Godfather Part II (1974)
Nominated
 The Brink's Job (1978)
 Apocalypse Now (1979)
 The Natural (1984)

References

External links

1932 births
2017 deaths
American art directors
Best Art Direction Academy Award winners
Place of birth missing